Aaron is the name of a number of people and places in the Book of Mormon
Aaron (Book of Mormon city), a city
Aaron (Jaredite), a Jaredite
Aaron (Lamanite), a Lamanite king
Aaron (Nephite), a Nephite missionary